Rob Has a Podcast (RHAP) is an entertainment podcast hosted by former Survivor contestant Rob Cesternino. The podcast primarily provides commentary of reality television game shows.

Overview
Cesternino started RHAP in 2010, in order to cover Survivor: Heroes vs. Villains and the final season of Lost. He continually expanded the podcast over the next several years, adding coverage of Big Brother, The Amazing Race, and The Celebrity Apprentice.

Survivor 
During Survivor seasons, Cesternino records multiple podcasts about the show each week, including a live show immediately following the episode's airing with Stephen Fishbach, Survivor Know-It-Alls. RHAP also produces shows discussing Survivor that feature hosts other than Cesternino.

Big Brother 
During the Big Brother season, Cesternino and the Live Feed Correspondents record several podcasts about the show each week.

Notable guests
Cesternino has interviewed and worked with numerous Survivor and Big Brother contestants, as well as Vincent Pastore and Nicole Maines.

Special events

Reality Gamemasters
On February 20, 2013, Cesternino launched a Kickstarter campaign to fund a new project, Reality Gamemasters, in which six reality TV contestants would compete in a game of Risk, which would be filmed and would air on YouTube. On March 22, 2013, the project was successfully funded, receiving $7,036 from 170 individual backers. The miniseries, directed by Cesternino and Alex Forstenhausler, consisted of six episodes and began airing on June 3, 2013. The contestants included John Cochran, Sophie Clarke, and Stephen Fishbach of Survivor, and Ian Terry, Eric Stein, and Matt Hoffman of Big Brother. Andrea Boehlke hosted the competition, with additional Survivor contestants Billy Garcia and R.C. Saint-Amour making guest appearances on the show. Cesternino provided game commentary throughout each episode alongside Entertainment Weekly's Dalton Ross.

"Survivor Know-It-Alls" LIVE
Since October 2014, Cesternino has hosted at least one live Survivor viewing party and subsequent taping of "Survivor Know-It-Alls" every Survivor season. The event was traditionally held twice-yearly in New York City, with some seasons offering a second taping in other cities including Los Angeles and Toronto. Numerous other Survivor contestants have made appearances at the events.

Related podcasts

The Spyson Hour
In 2015, Cesternino launched The Spyson Hour with Tyson Apostol from Survivor and Spencer Pratt from The Hills. Apostol had been a frequent guest on Cesternino's Survivor podcast. The show began as a way for Apostol and Pratt to discuss season four of Marriage Boot Camp, where they had originally met as fellow participants. After the season finished airing, Apostol, Pratt, and Cesternino continued the podcast, focusing on events in their lives and on zany current events stories. Pratt abruptly left the show in the fall of 2015.

News AF 
Following Pratt's departure, Apostol and Cesternino created a new podcast, News AF, with Danny Bryson as the third co-host. Bryson was longtime friends with Apostol and had earlier appeared on 2015 documentary reality show 100 Miles From Nowhere on Animal Planet. Since 2016, Bryson also operates a separate YouTube channel, Mediocre Amateur, that shows his outdoor adventures. News AF discusses the real yet unconventional news found on the internet, and is frequently recorded and aired live on YouTube. The show is still active as of August 2022, with over 350 weekly episodes recorded.

Reception
RHAP has won five Podcast Awards: best entertainment podcast (2012, 2014); best video podcast (2013); and best produced podcast (2013). Most notably, RHAP beat hit podcast Serial in the People's Choice category in 2014.

RHAP recorded its 1000th episode on November 14, 2014, and celebrated its fifth anniversary in February 2015. In 2015, the podcast was nominated for an Academy of Podcasters award in the entertainment category.

In 2020, Briana Kranich of ScreenRant named Rob Has a Podcast as one of the 10 Best Reality TV Podcasts You're Missing Out On.

References

External links
 Rob Has a Website
 Post Show Recaps
 Podcast One
 The Spyson Hour

2010 podcast debuts
Audio podcasts
Film and television podcasts